The State Art and Sculpture Museum is a museum dedicated to fine arts and sculpture in Ankara, Turkey. It was designed in 1927 by architect Arif Hikmet Koyunoğlu and built between 1927 and 1930 as the Türkocağı Building, upon the direction of Mustafa Kemal Atatürk, the founder and first President of Turkey. It is located close to the Ethnography Museum and houses a rich collection of Turkish art from the late 19th century to the present day. There are also galleries for guest exhibitions.

The museum was reopened after the restoration of the building in 1980. Today, the museum is a center of art where the most outstanding works of the artists who played important roles in the development of Turkish painting and sculpture are exhibited. In addition to the collections of art works reflecting the formation and development periods of Turkish plastic arts, and its classification, and to the Library of Plastic Arts which fills the gap in this field (enriched every year by the donations of domestic or foreign resources, or by new purchases), the archives of Turkish artists satisfactorily respond to the needs of researchers working in these fields.

The protection of the works of fine arts, which is one of the most important responsibilities of the museum beside training, is done by employing a method particularly developed to ensure the most satisfactory results when dealing with the problems arising from temperature, humidity and sorting difficulties. Any damage due to aging which may occur in spite of all protection measures are restored by experts in the special restoration unit which has been set up as a separate division within the museum.

During the restoration of the building in 1980, and in the following years, another important point on which considerable stress was laid is the construction of workshops of painting, sculpture and ceramics, which serve artists, both amateur and professional. The museum was again restored in 2011 to increase the exhibition spaces, restore the roof as well as other security measures.

As for the security measures, the whole building is furnished with closed-circuit TV, ultrasonic and firealarm systems for controlling all parts of the museum.

In addition to the workshop where painting and traditional printing courses are held (and demanded by the public beyond the capacity of the museum), special workshops for Turkish ornamental arts, ceramic, and sculpture will be opened in the near future.

Exhibitions of painting, sculpture, ceramic, printing arts and photography that are programmed to take place in Turkey within the framework of international cultural agreements, are exhibited in the three galleries reserved for periodical exhibitions; thus, the art works of foreign countries are made known to the Turkish public. In addition, exhibitions of Turkish artworks selected from the permanent collection of the museum are organized in foreign countries, within the framework of international cultural agreements. Besides these exhibitions, retrospective exhibitions organized by the General Directorate of Fine Arts; individual exhibitions and competitive exhibitions are among the other activities of the museum.

In the historical hall which has been transformed to its original design during the restorations, different kinds of activities such as concerts, theatrical performances and movie projections take place.

Serving to public with its modern cafeteria, sales outlet and audio system, the institution goes beyond an exhibition place for old artwork; comprising all attributes of a modern museum of arts.

Gallery

See also
Ethnography Museum of Ankara
Museum of Anatolian Civilizations
Çengelhan Rahmi M. Koç Museum
War of Independence Museum

References

External links
Over 200 pictures as well as shots of the museum's interior and exterior
State Art and Sculpture Museum Virtual Tour

Museums in Altındağ, Ankara
Art museums and galleries in Turkey
National museums in Turkey
Buildings and structures completed in 1930
Architecture in Turkey
Art museums established in 1930
1930 establishments in Turkey
First Turkish National architecture